Roman Wallner (born 4 February 1982) is an Austrian former professional footballer who played as a forward and manager. He is currently Salzburger AK 1914's manager.

Club career
Born in Graz, Styria, Wallner began his career with hometown Sturm Graz in 1998. In the following year he moved to Rapid Wien, where he would have his most successful years, appearing in over 100 matches and scoring 42 goals over five seasons with the club. He then spent one year spells at German club Hannover 96 and VfB Admira Wacker Mödling before signing with Austria Vienna in 2005. He left the club in 2007.

At the beginning of the 2007–08 season, Wallner signed a one-year contract including the option of a 2nd year with Scottish Premier League outfit Falkirk F.C.

In November 2007, Roman signed for Scottish First Division Hamilton Academical on loan from Falkirk, scoring once in four games against Stirling Albion. He returned to Falkirk the following month.

In January 2008, he travelled to Greece where he was on trial for the Greek Cup 2006–07 winners Larissa F.C. In the same month Falkirk announced that Wallner had been released from his contract by mutual consent. In late January, he signed with Apollon Kalamarias.

On 3 February 2008, Apollon Kalamarias' player Barkoglou scored a last minute goal in a match against Olympiacos which ended 1–0 to Apollon. Olympiakos appealed against Wallner's appearance in the match, because according to FIFA rules a player could play for no more than two teams per season (having already played for Falkirk and Hamilton Academical), because of this Apollon lost the game in cards 0–3 and had 1 point deducted. The case went to the jurisdiction of CAS. The appeal for provisional measures was declined. After the end of the Greek Superleague, Apollon Kalamarias was relegated and the deducted points would be inefficient to keep them clear of relegation. Therefore, the appeal against the first decision was withdrawn. Olympiacos won the title leading the table with runners-up AEK Athens trailing by only two points. This fact, along with the claims by the AEK chairman Demis Nikolaidis and footballers like Rivaldo, Traianos Dellas and Nikos Lyberopoulos that the Greek Football Association was responsible for this outcome, left the AEK fans with a taste of unjustice. By then, Roman Wallner was one of the most identifiable and recnognisable footballers in Greece and the controversy about his case will be remembered by all the Greek football fans in the years to come.

International career
He made his debut for Austria in an April 2001 World Cup qualification match against Liechtenstein.

Coaching career
After retiring, Wallner was hired by Salzburger AK 1914 as an individual coach both for the first team but also for the youth teams, mainly be responsible for the strikers. On 17 October 2019, Wallner was appointed caretaker manager for the last three games of the year, following the departure of Andreas Fötschl.

On May 1st 2020, Wallner was appointed Salzburger AK 1914 manager.

Career statistics

International
Source:

Honours

Club
Austria Wien
 Austrian Football Bundesliga (2): 2006
 Austrian Cup (2): 2006, 2007 with Austria Wien

Red Bull Salzburg
 Austrian Football Bundesliga: 2010

Individual
 Austrian Footballer of the Year: 2001

References

External links
 
 Roman Wallner's profile at Red Bull Salzburg's official site 
 Player profile – Apollon Kalamarias
 Player profile – Austria Archive
 Rapid stats – Rapid Archiv

Living people
1982 births
Footballers from Graz
Association football forwards
Austrian footballers
Austrian football managers
Austria international footballers
SK Sturm Graz players
SK Rapid Wien players
Hannover 96 players
FC Admira Wacker Mödling players
FK Austria Wien players
Falkirk F.C. players
Hamilton Academical F.C. players
Apollon Pontou FC players
Xanthi F.C. players
LASK players
FC Red Bull Salzburg players
RB Leipzig players
FC Wacker Innsbruck (2002) players
SV Grödig players
Austrian Football Bundesliga players
Bundesliga players
Scottish Premier League players
Austrian expatriate footballers
Austrian expatriate sportspeople in Germany
Austrian expatriate sportspeople in Scotland
Austrian expatriate sportspeople in Greece
Expatriate footballers in Germany
Expatriate footballers in Scotland
Expatriate footballers in Greece